Richard J. Barohn is an American neurologist and the Executive Vice Chancellor for Health Affairs at the University of MissouriUniversity of Missouri. He formerly served as the University Distinguished Professor and Gertrude & Dewey Ziegler Professor at University of Kansas. He is an Elected Fellow of the American Academy of Neurology.

References

University of Kansas faculty
American neurologists
University of Missouri alumni
Living people
Year of birth missing (living people)